Elinor B. Cahn (1925–March 20, 2020) was an American photographer. Cahn, who became a photographer later in life, was known for her photographs of street and neighborhood life in East Baltimore, Maryland.

Early life and education
Cahn was born in Baltimore to parents Ralph Bonwit and  Leona Frank. She married Charles M. Cahn Jr. at the age of 19. During World War II, she volunteered as an ambulance and truck driver for the Red Cross.

It was not until after the war that Cahn began her art career. As a student at the Maryland Institute College of Art, she took a class on social documentary. She began to document her neighbors as part of the class, in a project that would eventually become the East Baltimore Documentary Photography Project. Numerous photographs from the project would be acquired by the Smithsonian Museum and the University of Maryland, Baltimore.

Career
Her work is included in the collections of the Smithsonian American Art Museum, the University of Maryland, Baltimore County and the Jewish Museum of Maryland. She Was often invited into the homes of her subjects, where she would photograph them.

References

1925 births
2020 deaths
20th-century American women artists
20th-century American photographers
Photographers from Maryland
Street photographers
American women photographers
Artists from Baltimore
Maryland Institute College of Art alumni
21st-century American women